
Gmina Niechanowo is a rural gmina (administrative district) in Gniezno County, Greater Poland Voivodeship, in west-central Poland.

Villages
Gmina Niechanowo contains the villages and settlements of Arcugowo, Cielimowo, Czechowo, Drachowo, Goczałkowo, Grotkowo, Gurówko, Gurowo, Jarząbkowo, Jelitowo, Jelonek, Karsewo, Kędzierzyn, Malczewo, Marysin, Mierzewo, Mikołajewice, Miroszka, Niechanowo, Nowa Wieś Niechanowska, Potrzymowo, Trzuskołoń, Żelazkowo and Żółcz.

Neighbouring gminas
Gmina Niechanowo is bordered by the town of Gniezno and by the gminas of Czerniejewo, Gniezno, Witkowo and Września.

References
Polish official population figures 2006

Niechanowo
Gniezno County